Charles Carmen Foti, Jr. (born November 30, 1937), is a lawyer in New Orleans and a politician who served a single term from 2004 to 2008 as the Democratic Attorney General of the U.S. state of Louisiana, United States. Prior to becoming attorney general, Foti had been repeatedly reelected and served for thirty years as Orleans Parish criminal sheriff.

Foti won the attorney general's office when the incumbent Democrat, Richard Ieyoub of Lake Charles, ran unsuccessfully for governor in the 2003 primary. Foti defeated the Republican candidate, Suzanne Haik Terrell, also of New Orleans, 689,179 votes (54 percent) to 597,917 (46 percent).

Foti failed in his bid to win reelection as attorney general, having finished last in the three-way nonpartisan blanket primary held on October 20, 2007. The leading candidates were the Republican lawyer, Royal Alexander of Shreveport, and the Democratic District Attorney, James D. "Buddy" Caldwell, Jr., of Tallulah. Caldwell won the general election and was sworn in to replace Foti on January 14, 2008. Caldwell later switched to the Republican Party in 2011, to secure his second term.

On February 1, 2014, Foti ran again for the Orleans Parish sheriff's position; he finished second in a four-candidate field. He polled 23,676 votes (28.6 percent). Foti's fellow Democrat and successor as sheriff, Marlin N. Gusman, with 40,557 votes (48.9 percent), nearly won the position outright in the nonpartisan blanket primary. Foti and Gusman entered a runoff election on March 15, in which Gusman handily prevailed, 40,068 (66.7 percent) to Foti's 19,996 (33.3 percent).

Early life and education
Foti was born in 1937 in New Orleans. He attended public schools, graduating from Warren Easton High School in the city. He earned a Bachelor's degree at the University of New Orleans. After military service and working, Foti returned to university, earning a J.D., Loyola University New Orleans College of Law in 1965.

Personal
From 1955 to 1958, Foti served in the United States Army.

A long-time advocate for the elderly, during his time as criminal sheriff, Foti organized Thanksgiving meals for New Orleans senior citizens who were alone or could not afford a holiday meal.  He also started a back-to-work program for seniors over the age of fifty-five. As attorney general, Foti investigated and prosecuted abuse of the elderly in Louisiana's health-care facilities.

After vacating the attorney general's office, Foti joined the New Orleans law firm Kahn Swick & Foti, LLC, where he engages in the practice of securities and consumer fraud law.

Criticism

In the wake of Hurricane Katrina, Foti as State AG prosecuted private citizens on behalf of the numerous elderly New Orleans residents who died in flooding, power failures, and resulting disaster. Foti reportedly claimed that some medical staff, who worked at Memorial Hospital in New Orleans during the storm, had murdered several patients.
In July 2007, Dr. Pou sued Foti, accusing him of playing politics with her life and the dead from Katrina.
After the police conducted a lengthy investigation, a grand jury in July 2007 declined to indict Pou.
 The charges have since been expunged. In 2009, the legislature passed a bill to pay Dr. Pou's legal fees, which was signed by Governor Bobby Jindal.
Several lawmakers have apologized for the accusations against Pou. The failed prosecution of Dr. Pou was an issue during Foti's unsuccessful re-election campaign in 2007.

In a related story, the owners of a nursing home near Poydras filed a civil suit against federal, state and local officials, including the Army Corps of Engineers, Governor Kathleen Babineaux Blanco, Attorney General Charles C. Foti, Jr., and numerous other authorities and agencies for failing to evacuate nursing home residents during the hurricane.

Electoral history
Criminal Sheriff, Parish of Orleans, 1990

Threshold > 50%

First Ballot, February 3, 1990

Criminal Sheriff, Parish of Orleans, 1994

Threshold > 50%

First Ballot, February 5, 1994

Criminal Sheriff, Parish of Orleans, 1998

Threshold > 50%

First Ballot, February 7, 1998

Criminal Sheriff, Parish of Orleans, 2002

Threshold > 50%

First Ballot, February 2, 2002

Attorney General of Louisiana, 2003

Threshold > 50%

First Ballot, October 4, 2003

Attorney General of Louisiana, 2007

Threshold > 50%

First Ballot, October 20, 2007

References

External links
Official site

Living people
1937 births
Louisiana Attorneys General
Louisiana Democrats
Warren Easton High School alumni
University of New Orleans alumni
Loyola University New Orleans alumni
Politicians from New Orleans
Louisiana sheriffs
United States Army soldiers
Lawyers from New Orleans